Oskar Schnirch (1902–1995) was an Austrian cinematographer. He worked on over eighty films during the Weimar, Nazi and West German eras.

Selected filmography
 Lady Windermere's Fan (1935)
 Confetti (1936)
 The Empress's Favourite (1936)
 Darling of the Sailors (1937)
 Beate's Mystery (1938)
 Uproar in Damascus (1939)
 Marriage in Small Doses (1939)
 Hurrah! I'm a Father (1939)
 Escape in the Dark (1939)
 Venus on Trial (1941)
 Happiness is the Main Thing (1941)
 Front Theatre (1942)
 Maresi (1948)
 The Singing House (1948)
 Vagabonds (1949)
 Wedding with Erika (1950)
 Furioso (1950)
 Shame on You, Brigitte! (1952)
 The Day Before the Wedding (1952)
 The Spendthrift (1953)
 Irene in Trouble (1953)
 Everything for Father (1953)
 Diary of a Married Woman (1953)
 Guitars of Love (1954)
 The Red Prince (1954)
 Mozart (1955)
 Music, Music and Only Music (1955)
 The Immenhof Girls (1955)
 Santa Lucia (1956)
 The Domestic Tyrant (1959)
  (1963, TV film)

Bibliography
 Giesen, Rolf. Nazi Propaganda Films: A History and Filmography. McFarland & Co., 2003.

External links

1902 births
1995 deaths
People from Budišov nad Budišovkou
People from the Margraviate of Moravia
Austrian cinematographers
Moravian-German people
Austrian people of Moravian-German descent